Höga berg och djupa dalar is a traditional Swedish folk song  folkvisa used when dancing around the midsummer pole and the Christmas tree.

Publication
Julens önskesångbok, 1997, under the lines "Tjugondag Knut dansar julen ut", credited as "folk game"

Recordings
An early recording was done in February 1901, but never released commercial.

References

Swedish folk songs
Year of song unknown
Songwriter unknown